D'Arcy or D'arcy may refer to:

Places
Bois-d'Arcy (disambiguation), multiple locations
Offord D'Arcy, a village near Huntingdon in the county of Cambridgeshire, England
Tolleshunt D'Arcy, a village in the County of Essex, Eastern England
D'Arcy, British Columbia, an unincorporated community in Canada
D'Arcy, Saskatchewan, a village in Canada

Other uses
D'arcy (name), including a list of people with the name

See also
Darcy (disambiguation)
Tribes of Galway, which includes D'Arcy as one of the tribes